K-14 was the most recent version of the developing process for Kodak's Kodachrome transparency film before its discontinuation (the last revision having been designated Process K-14M). It superseded previous versions of the Kodachrome process used with older films (such as K-12 for Kodachrome II and Kodachrome-X).

The K-14 process differed significantly from its contemporary, the E-6 process, in both complexity and length. Kodachrome film has no integral color couplers; dyes are produced during processing (each color in a separate step) by the reaction of the color couplers with the oxidised developer.

Due to declining sales, Kodak discontinued production of all K-14 chemistry in 2009, concurrently with Kodachrome 64 film. Dwayne's Photo, in Parsons, Kansas, operated the last K-14 line in the world, discontinued sales on December 30, 2010; the last roll was processed on January 18, 2011.

Steps 
The layers in the film are, top-to-bottom: blue sensitive (yellow), yellow filter, blue-green sensitive (magenta), blue-red sensitive (cyan), acetate base, rem-jet antihalation backing.

The processing cycle is as follows:

 Backing removal: An alkaline bath softens the cellulose acetate phthalate binder. A spray wash and buffer removes the rem-jet anti-halation backing.
 First Developer: All exposed silver halide crystals are developed to metallic silver via a PQ developer. The yellow filter layer becomes opaque because it has a combination of Lippmann emulsion (very tiny grains) and Carey Lea silver (metallic silver particles that are small enough that they are yellow rather than gray.)
 Wash
 Red light re-exposure through the base: This makes the remaining undeveloped silver halide in the cyan layers developable.
 Cyan developer: The solution contains a color developer and a cyan coupler. These are colorless in solution. After the color developer develops the silver, the oxidized developer reacts with the cyan coupler to form cyan dye. The dye is much less soluble than either the developer or the coupler so it stays in the red layer of the film.
 Wash
 Blue light re-exposure from the top: This makes the remaining undeveloped grains in the blue sensitive layer (the yellow layer) developable. The now opaque yellow filter layers prevents the blue light from exposing the  magenta layer (the green sensitive layer, which is also sensitive to blue light).  It is important to avoid stray printing light exposing the film base of film.
 Yellow developer: Analogous to the cyan developer.
 Wash
 Magenta developer: This contains a chemical fogging agent that makes all of the remaining undeveloped silver developable. If everything has worked correctly, nearly all of this silver is in the magenta layers. The developer and magenta coupler work just like the cyan and yellow developers to produce magenta dye that is insoluble and stays in the film.
 Wash
 Conditioner: Prepares the metallic silver for the bleach step.
 Bleach: (ferric EDTA) Oxidises the metallic silver to silver halide. The bleach must be aerated. The former ferricyanide bleach did not require aeration and did not require a conditioner.
 Fix: Converts the silver halide to soluble compounds which are then dissolved and washed from the film
 Wash: Washes the fixer out of the film.
 Rinse: Contains a wetting agent to reduce water spots.
 Dry

The result is three different color records each with the appropriate dye, just like other color films. The original Kodachrome process in 1935 used dye bleaches and was a far more complex process. Although the formulae have changed over the years, the basic process steps have followed a similar pattern since the introduction of "selective re-exposure" Kodachrome in 1938.

References

External links 
 Kodak: Processing Kodachrome film
 K-14 Process Demonstration

Photographic film processes